Dmitriyevskoye is a rural locality (a village) in Ivanovskoye Rural Settlement, Kovrovsky District, Vladimir Oblast, Russia. The population was 10 as of 2010.

Geography 
Dmitriyevskoye is located on the Nerekhta River, 39 km south of Kovrov (the district's administrative centre) by road. Mordviny is the nearest rural locality.

References 

Rural localities in Kovrovsky District